Nik Bonaddio is an American Internet entrepreneur best known for founding and serving as the CEO of the popular sports analytics site numberFire. In 2017, he was named Chief Product Officer at FanDuel, who acquired numberFire in September 2015.

Career 

After graduation, Bonaddio began work at Yahoo! as a software engineer. Bonaddio founded numberFire in 2009, after a successful appearance on ABC's Who Wants to Be a Millionaire with Regis Philbin. During the show's 10th anniversary run, Bonaddio won $100,000, which was then used to found numberFire.

Since its founding, numberFire has grown to over 600,000 subscribers and has gained recognition in the marketplace for accurate predictions, including correctly predicting winners of the Super Bowl and the NCAA Men's Division I Basketball Championship.

numberFire was purchased by FanDuel in September 2015. Terms were not disclosed.

After spending three years as the Chief Product Officer at FanDuel, Bonaddio left in 2020 to start BigBrain, an online gaming company.

Education 

Bonaddio was raised in Wexford, Pennsylvania, a suburb in the North Hills neighborhood of Pittsburgh, and graduated from nearby North Allegheny Senior High School. During his time at North Allegheny, he was featured multiple times in local newspapers for awards received for his online design collective, Lockjaw and was active in the soccer and tennis programs.

He received a B.S. in 2004 from Carnegie Mellon University in Information Systems, followed by a M.S. in Information Systems Management in 2005. During his time at Carnegie Mellon, he was a two-time All-American athlete and record holder in track and field and a member of the Kappa Delta Rho fraternity.

Awards 

A prominent member of the emerging NYC tech scene, Bonaddio has been featured in a variety of publications and conferences. In addition to routinely contributing to ESPN, he has been featured in Sports Illustrated in 2011, FastCompany in 2012, and Under30CEO and Entrepreneur magazine amongst others in 2013.

Other ventures 

In addition to his professional life, Bonaddio is also a highly-ranked and successful high-stakes daily fantasy sports player. In 2022, he finished 3rd in FanDuel's World Fantasy Baseball Championship, and 1st in FanDuel's World Fantasy Football Championship. In March 2023, Bonaddio also finished 1st in FanDuel's World Fantasy Basketball Championship, becoming the first non-professional in the industry's history to win back-to-back live final titles, as well as the first to finish in the top three in three straight finals.

References

External links 
 Official website
 Company website

Living people
American computer businesspeople
Heinz College of Information Systems and Public Policy alumni
1982 births
21st-century American businesspeople